Lanjabad (also Romanized as Lanjābād and Lenjābād) is a village in Dorud Rural District, in the Central District of Dorud County, Lorestan Province, Iran. At the 2006 census, its population was 60, in 13 families.

References 

Towns and villages in Dorud County